Janja Lalich (b. 1945) is an American sociologist and writer. Lalich is best known as a foremost expert on cults and coercion, charismatic authority, power relations, ideology and social control. She is a professor emerita of sociology at the California State University, Chico.

Early life and education
The daughter of Serbian immigrants, Lalich was born in 1945. Lalich has a Ph.D. in Human and Organizational Systems from Fielding Graduate University in Santa Barbara, California. Beginning in the 1970s, Lalich spent around ten years as part of a radical Marxist-Leninist group, the Democratic Workers Party in California. She later came to realize that the group was a cult. Lalich recalls that during her time in the group she stored questions and doubts in the back of her mind, unable to express them. Lalich became a high-ranking member of the group working long hours with little contact outside the immediate members. She claims that ex-members were harassed and attacked and that she felt increasingly threatened. Eventually, the group dissolved and she was able to leave.

Career
She is a recently retired professor in the sociology department of California State University, Chico, and has contributed several articles to academic journals on the subject of cults and religions. After her experiences in a radical political group that she identifies as a cult, she founded the Center for Research on Influence and Control. In her work, she describes the main features of a "totalistic" control group or cult: "They 'espouse an all-encompassing belief system', 'exhibit excessive devotion to the leader', 'avoid criticism of the group and its leader', and 'feel disdain for non-members'."

Lalich went on to write several books on the subject of cults, including her best known book, Bounded Choice (2004), based on Heaven's Gate. As a recognized international authority in the field, Lalich has also appeared in several court cases as an expert witness on coercive control or undue influence.

In 2007, Lalich was awarded the Margaret L. Singer Award: "for advancing the understanding of coercive persuasion, undue influence, and psychological manipulation" by the International Cultic Studies Association.

Bibliography
 Captive Hearts, Captive Minds
 Cults in Our Midst
 Crazy Therapies
 Misunderstanding Cults
 Take Back Your Life
 Escaping Utopia: Growing Up in a Cult, Getting Out, and Starting Over

References

1945 births
Living people
Researchers of new religious movements and cults
Critics of new religious movements
American people of Serbian descent
People from Chico, California
California State University, Chico faculty
American women sociologists
Brainwashing theory proponents
21st-century American women
Former Marxists